The Palestinian Presidential Guard (PPG) is a branch of the Palestinian Security Services under the direct control of the President of the State of Palestine. Its primary role is protection of the President and other VIPs, as well as execute ceremonial functions. The force may also execute special combat functions.

Establishment 

The predecessor of the Presidential Guard was the "Presidential Security", established in 1994 by then President of the Palestinian Authority (PA), Yasser Arafat and largely composed of members from Force 17.

In 2006, the Presidential Security was established as a separate force and renamed "Presidential Guard". The Presidential Guard was made up entirely of Fatah activists loyal to Abbas. The US was highly involved with the training of officers, coordinated by Lt. Gen. Keith Dayton. The training was part of a systematic effort to bolster Abbas and his Fatah loyalists to counter the political success of Hamas, who had won the 2006 legislative election and formed the new PA government. Hamas had formed its own security service within the Palestinian Authority, the Executive Force.

As of 2006, the estimated strength of the PPG was some 3,500 men, while a considerable increase was planned.

Gallery

See also

Palestinian Civil Defence
Palestinian Civil Police Force
Palestinian National Security Force
Palestinian Preventive Security

References

Palestinian Security Services
Guards of honour